Godavari District was a district in Madras Presidency in British India created in 1859, which was formerly within the Rajahmundry (Rajamahendravaram) District created in 1823.

In 1859, Rajahmundry district, along with Masulipatnam and Guntur districts, was reorganised into Godavari and Krishna districts.

In 1925, the Godavari district was divided into West Godavari and East Godavari districts with Eluru and Kakinada as their respective capitals. These districts have since remained under the same names till the present day.

References

External links
 Extent of the Godavari district marked on OpenStreetMap: West Godavari, East Godavari,

Madras Presidency
Districts of the Madras Presidency